Gardella is a surname. Notable people with the surname include:

Al Gardella (1918–2006), American baseball player
Danny Gardella (1920–2005), American baseball player
Gus Gardella (1895–1974), American football player
Ignazio Gardella (1905–1999), Italian architect and designer
Kay Gardella (1923–2005), American journalist
Tess Gardella (1894–1950), Italian-American performer